Lora Webb Nichols (1883–1962) was an American photographer and diarist.

Early life and education
Nichols was born in Boulder, Colorado. Her grandfather was Colorado Lieutenant Governor David H. Nichols. She moved with her family to Encampment, Wyoming.

Life and work
Nichols began photographing in 1899 at age 16. Lucy Davies, writing in The Daily Telegraph, described her work as recording Wyoming's "inconsequential chores and rituals (washing, shovelling snow, braiding hair) rather than grand events. Even so, her frank, bold pictures capture the clean-cut thrill of pioneer life, of America's hugeness and scope." Around 1905, Nichols built a darkroom and worked as a photographer and a photo finisher. In 1925, she founded three businesses in Encampment: the Rocky Mountain Studio which developed film and loaned cameras; The Encampment Echo newspaper; and The Sugar Bowl, selling soda and ice cream. When cowboys and young men in the Civilian Conservation Corps passed through town, Nichols would loan them a camera and ask them to return with photographs. These images represent about a third of her archive.

In 1935, she moved to Stockton, California and worked in a children's home, eventually becoming its director. She returned to Encampment in 1956, where she died in 1962.

Personal life
She had six children.

Legacy
There are 24000 photographs in Nichols' archive, 16000 of them taken by her, held at the American Heritage Center of the University of Wyoming. That archive also includes a manuscript for her unfinished memoir, I Remember: a Girl's Eye View of Early Days in the Rocky Mountains. Her diaries and other photographs are held at Grand Encampment Museum in Encampment.

Publications
Encampment, Wyoming: Selections from the Lora Webb Nichols Archive 1899–1948. Amsterdam: Fw, 2020. Edited by Nicole Jean Hill. . With essays by Nancy F. Anderson and Hill.
Amsterdam: Fw, 2021.

References

External links

Nichols' archive at the American Heritage Center of the University of Wyoming
Nichols' archive at the Grand Encampment Museum

1962 deaths
1883 births
20th-century American photographers
19th-century American photographers
Photographers from Colorado
20th-century American women photographers
19th-century American women photographers
People from Boulder, Colorado
Photographers from Wyoming
People from Carbon County, Wyoming